James Calvert may refer to:
 James Calvert (divine) (died 1698), English Nonconformist divine
 James Calvert (missionary) (1813–1892), British Wesleyan Methodist missionary, active in Fiji
 James Calvert (explorer) (1825–1884), British explorer and botanist, active in colonial Australia
 James F. Calvert (1920–2009), United States Navy officer and nuclear submarine commander
 Mike Calvert (James Michael Calvert, 1913–1998), British soldier